Johann Gottfried Stallbaum (September 25, 1793 - January 24, 1861), German classical scholar, was born at Zaasch, near Delitzsch in Saxony.

From 1820 until his death Stallbaum was connected with Thomasschule zu Leipzig, from 1835 as rector. In 1840 he was also appointed extraordinary professor in the university.

His reputation rests upon his work on Plato, of which he published two complete editions: the one (1821-1825) a revised text with critical apparatus, the other (1827-1860) containing exhaustive prolegomena and commentary written in excellent Latin, a fundamental contribution to Platonic exegesis.

A separate edition of the Parmenides (1839), with the commentary of Proclus, deserves mention. Stallbaum also edited the commentaries of Eustathius of Thessalonica on the Iliad and Odyssey, and the Grammaticae latinae institutiones of Thomas Ruddiman.

See CH Lipsius in the Osterprogramm of the Thomasschule (1861); R Hoche in Allgemeine Deutsche Biographie, vol. xxxv.

References

1793 births
1861 deaths
German classical scholars
Heads of schools in Germany
St. Thomas School, Leipzig teachers